Fabrício Bastezini (born 14 June 1988), known as Gadeia, is a Brazilian futsal player who plays as a winger for ElPozo Murcia FS and the Brazilian national futsal team.

Honours
UEFA Futsal Champions League fourth place: 2018–19

References

External links
Liga Nacional Fútbol Sala profile

1988 births
Living people
Futsal forwards
Brazilian men's futsal players
ADC Intelli players
ElPozo Murcia FS players
Inter FS players
Brazilian expatriate sportspeople in Spain